Helge Sunde (born 9 June 1965 in Stryn, Norway) is a Norwegian composer and musician (trombone and multi-instrumentalist), known for his compositions in contemporary music and jazz for large ensembles and for his works as music arranger for symphony orchestras in collaboration with artists.

Career 
Sunde has a diploma in composition from the Norwegian Academy of Music (1995) in Oslo, where he studied under guidance of Olav Anton Thommessen, Bjørn Kruse, Lasse Thoresen and Alfred Janson. His diploma work Festina lente is available on the album Absolute Pling-Plong: Eight ways of making music, performed by the BIT20 Ensemble. During his studies he was awarded "Work of the Year" by NOPA (now Edvardprisen), together with Anneli Drecker and Nils Johansen from the band Bel Canto, for the work "Tierre Obletz" (1993). Sunde was awarded the Spellemannprisen 1990 within the band Oslo Groove Company, and was also nominated within Sharp9 (2004), as well as within Norske Store Orkester (2006) as Sunde also is musical director for (2005–).

His compositions has been written for and performed by ensembles like Kringkastingsorkesteret, Stavanger Symphony Orchestra, Bergen Filharmoniske Orkester, Oslo Sinfonietta He has also contributed to the show "Barnas Supershow" on Norwegian television NRK. Sunde collaborates in the Ophelia Orchestra and has contributed to releases by Ole Paus (Biggle's testamente, 1992), Motorpsycho (Let'em eat cake, 2000) and Trygve Seim (Sangam, 2004).

Honors 
1990: Spellemannprisen in the class "Jazz" for the album Anno 1990, within the band Oslo Groove Company
1993: NOPA's award (now Edvardprisen) in the class "Work of the Year" for the work "Tierre Obletz", together with the Bel Canto musicians Anneli Drecker and Nils Johansen
2010 Echo Jazz Award (German Grammy) for The album Finding Nymo
2011 Spellemansprisen i folkemusikk for "Never on a Sunday" with Ragnhild Furebotn as producer, arranger and musician.
2013: Edvardprisen in the "Open class" for the album Windfall

Discography 

With Kringkastingsorkesteret
2006: Rotations (Aurora)

With Ensemble Denada
2007: Denada (ACT).
2009: Finding Nymo (ACT).
2013: Windfall (Ocella)

With Eberhard Weber
Hommage à Eberhard Weber (ECM, 2015) - conductor

References

External links

Blixband at NorCD
The Record Company Reflect

20th-century Norwegian trombonists
21st-century Norwegian trombonists
20th-century Norwegian multi-instrumentalists
21st-century Norwegian multi-instrumentalists
Norwegian jazz trombonists
Male trombonists
Norwegian multi-instrumentalists
Norwegian composers
Norwegian male composers
Spellemannprisen winners
Musicians from Stryn
Living people
1965 births
21st-century trombonists
20th-century Norwegian male musicians
21st-century Norwegian male musicians
Male jazz musicians
Ensemble Denada members
Geir Lysne Listening Ensemble members
Oslo Groove Company members
ACT Music artists